"Deadline" is a 1944 science fiction short story by American writer Cleve Cartmill, first published in Astounding Science Fiction. The story described the then-secret atomic bomb in some detail. At that time the bomb was still under development and top secret, which prompted a visit by the FBI.

In 1943, Cartmill suggested to John W. Campbell, the then-editor of Astounding, that he could write a story about a futuristic super-bomb. Campbell liked the idea and supplied Cartmill with considerable background information gleaned from unclassified scientific journals, on the use of Uranium-235 to make a nuclear fission device. The resulting story appeared in the issue of Astounding dated March 1944, which actually appeared early in February of that year.

By March 8 it had come to the attention of the Counterintelligence Corps, who saw many similarities between the technical details in the story and the research currently being undertaken in great secrecy at Los Alamos. Gregory Benford describes the incident as told to him by Edward Teller in his autobiographical essay "Old Legends":

Coming three years later in the same magazine, Cleve Cartmill's "Deadline" provoked astonishment in the lunch table discussions at Los Alamos. It really did describe isotope separation and the bomb itself in detail, and raised as its principal plot pivot the issue the physicists were then debating among themselves: should the Allies use it? To the physicists from many countries clustered in the high mountain strangeness of New Mexico, cut off from their familiar sources of humanist learning, it must have seemed particularly striking that Cartmill described an allied effort, a joint responsibility laid upon many nations. 
Discussion of Cartmill's "Deadline" was significant. The story's detail was remarkable, its sentiments even more so. Did this rather obscure story hint at what the American public really thought about such a superweapon, or would think if they only knew? 
Talk attracts attention, Teller recalled a security officer who took a decided interest, making notes, saying little. In retrospect, it was easy to see what a wartime intelligence monitor would make of the physicists' conversations. Who was this guy Cartmill, anyway? Where did he get these details? Who tipped him to the isotope separation problem? "and that is why Mr. Campbell received his visitors."

Fearing a security breach, the FBI began an investigation into Cartmill, Campbell, and some of their acquaintances (including Isaac Asimov and Robert A. Heinlein). It appears that the authorities eventually accepted the explanation that the story's material had been gleaned from unclassified sources, but as a precautionary measure they requested that Campbell should not publish any further stories about nuclear technology for the remainder of the war.

Campbell, in the meantime, had guessed from the number of Astounding subscribers who had suddenly moved to the Los Alamos area, that the US government probably had some sort of technical or scientific project ongoing there; he declined to volunteer this information to the FBI.

Critical evaluation
"Deadline" was described by Robert Silverberg as "a klutzy clunker" and by Cartmill himself as "that stinker". According to Silverberg, Cartmill also used the phrase "it stinks" when describing the story to a postman who was acting as an informer for military intelligence.

However, the story was included in the anthologies The Best of Science Fiction (1946; ed. Groff Conklin), Science Fiction of the Forties (1978; ed. Joseph Olander, Martin Harry Greenberg, and Frederik Pohl), The Golden Age of Science Fiction (1980; ed. Groff Conklin), and The Great Science Fiction Stories: Volume 6, 1944  (1981; ed. Isaac Asimov and Martin H. Greenberg).

References

External links

"Deadline" at the Internet Archive
"The Astounding Investigation: The Manhattan Project's Confrontation With Science Fiction, Albert I. Berger 1984 (Analog)

1944 short stories
Science fiction short stories
Manhattan Project in popular culture
Works originally published in Analog Science Fiction and Fact